Dragon Ball Z: Fusion Reborn, known in Japan as , is a 1995 Japanese animated fantasy martial arts film and the 12th film in the Dragon Ball Z series. It was originally released in Japan on March 4 at Toei Anime Fair, and dubbed into English by Funimation in 2006.

Plot 

In the Other World, a teenage oni is manning a cleansing machine and the loud volume of his walkman distracts him causing the machine to explode. The oni is engulfed by the freed evil spirit essence and transforms into a massive, childlike monster with dimensional manipulation abilities. As a result, the deceased are resurrected.

Goku and Pikkon are fighting in a tournament when they are interrupted by the appearance of a strange crystal-like substance and are sent to investigate the disturbance by the Grand Kai. They find the afterlife's "check-in station" to be encased in the crystal-like barrier which is also immune to their energy blasts. From inside of the station, its trapped attendant King Yemma directs them to the monster, Janemba, who refuses to drop the barrier. Goku lures Janemba to hell while Pikkon works to free Yenma.

Meanwhile, Earth comes under siege by an array of zombies, soldiers and past villains led by Freeza who attack a city until Gohan and Videl intervene with the former destroying him causing the villains to flee in terror. Goten and Trunks gather the magical Dragon Balls, summon the dragon Shenron, and ask him to rebuild the barrier between the living and dead but he is unable to do so. In hell, Janemba uses his unorthodox powers to best Goku until he powers up to Super Saiyan 3 and seemingly kills the monster who merely transforms into a much smaller albeit more powerful and sinister form. Goku is overwhelmed by Janemba but Vegeta has regained his physical body and arrives in time to help. However, the two Saiyans are still no match for Janemba and are forced to hide. Goku proposes using the Fusion Dance technique, but Vegeta pridefully refuses to join bodies with Goku.

Pikkon continues to try and free Yemma to no avail, and in his anger, insults the crystal substance which causes it to slightly crack. However, Pikkon's worst insults do not cause enough damage to rescue Yemma so he decides to aid Goku and Vegeta in their fight. After much persuasion, Vegeta agrees to fuse with Goku but Vegeta fails to extend his forefinger when required and the fusion fails, resulting in a weak, obese form named Veku. Janemba beats Veku severely and almost kills him, but the fusion wears off and Goku and Vegeta escape in time. Pikkon arrives to stall Janemba while Goku and Vegeta attempt the fusion again, this time successfully transforming into the immensely powerful Gogeta, who swiftly gains the advantage over Janemba and he uses his power to cleanse the demon of the evil essence inside him, causing him to revert into his oni form.

With Janemba vanquished, his hold over reality disappears and the deceased return to the afterlife. After sharing a good-natured farewell with Goku, Vegeta reverts to his spirit form and disappears. Back on Earth, Gohan, Videl, Goten, and Trunks depart back home. In a post-credits scene, a still-summoned Shenron still awaits another wish.

Cast

Music 
The song "We Gotta Power" was used as the film's opening theme.

Saikyō no Fusion 

 is the closing theme song of the film and is a single by Japanese singer  Hironobu Kageyama. It was released on 8 cm cd on March 1, 1995 in Japan only. It is coupled with the character song "Ai wa Barādo no Yō ni ~Vegeta no Theme~" performed by Shin Oya. The single charted 95 on Oricon.

Track list 
最強のフュージョンSaikyō no Fyūjon/The Strongest Fusion
愛はバラードのように～ベジータのテーマ～Ai wa Barādo no Yō ni~Bejīta no Tēma~/Love is Like a Ballad: Theme of Vegeta

English dub soundtrack 
The score for the English dub's composed by Nathan Johnson and Dave Moran. The Double Feature release contains an alternate audio track containing the English dub with original Japanese background music by Shunsuke Kikuchi and an ending theme of "Saikyō no Fusion".

Box office 
At the Japanese box office, the film sold 3.2million tickets and grossed .

On November 3 and 5, 2018, it had a joint limited theatrical release with the TV special Dragon Ball Z: Bardock – The Father of Goku (1990), titled as Dragon Ball Z: Saiyan Double Feature, by Fathom Events in the United States due to the upcoming release of Dragon Ball Super: Broly (2018). According to Box Office Mojo, as of November 7, 2018, the Saiyan Double Feature made a revenue of $540,707.

Releases 
It was released on DVD in North America on March 28, 2006, It was later released in final Double Feature set along with Wrath of the Dragon (1995) for Blu-ray and DVD on May 19, 2009, both feature full 1080p format in HD remastered 16:9 aspect ratio and an enhanced 5.1 surround mix. The film was re-released to DVD in final remastered thinpak collection on January 3, 2012, containing the last 4 Dragon Ball Z films.

Other companies 
A second English dub produced and released exclusively in Malaysia by Speedy Video features an unknown voice cast. The Speedy dub is notoriously known among fans for its poor grammar and voice acting, low-quality audio mixing, and limited pool of voice actors, as well as heavily compressed low-resolution video quality due to it being released on Video CD.

Notes

References

External links 

 Official anime website of Toei Animation
 Announcement on FUNimationFilms
 
 

1995 anime films
Cultural depictions of Adolf Hitler
Fusion Reborn
Japanese fantasy adventure films
Funimation
Toei Animation films
Films scored by Shunsuke Kikuchi
Films directed by Shigeyasu Yamauchi
Films set in hell